Nedešćina is a village in the Istria County in Croatia. It is part of Sveta Nedelja municipality.

References

Populated places in Istria County